Khn'nr is a character appearing in American comic books published by Marvel Comics. Created by Paul Jenkins and Tom Raney, the character first appeared in Civil War: The Return (March 2007). Khn'nr was a Skrull sleeper agent posing as the Kree Captain Mar-Vell (also known as Captain Marvel).

The shapeshifting Skrull Khn'nr was bonded with the DNA of Mar-Vell to lock his body into Mar-Vell's form and given technological replicas of the Kree Nega-Bands. However, his mental conditioning was botched, causing Khn'nr's personality to be erased and leaving the Mar-Vell persona dominant. Though part of the Skrull invasion of Earth, this Captain Marvel decides to fight against the invading Skrulls.

Publication history
In 2007, Mar-Vell supposedly returned to the Marvel Universe during Marvel's Civil War crossover storyline. He made his appearance in the "Civil War: The Return" one-shot, written by Paul Jenkins. It was later revealed that this was in fact a Skrull named Khn'nr during the 2008 Captain Marvel mini-series, which spun out of the events of his Civil War appearance.

Fictional character biography
As part of the Skrull Secret Invasion, a shapeshifting Skrull called Khn'nr was locked into the shape of Mar-Vell, the first Captain Marvel and given technological replicas of the Kree Nega-Bands to replicate Captain Marvel's powers. Khn'nr received memory implants to turn him into a sleeper agent making him believe he was Captain Marvel supposedly up until the time of the invasion when a psychological trigger would be activated to return him to his Skrull persona.

The real Mar-Vell died of cancer so to explain his comeback from death, a false memory was implanted in the Skrull Mar-Vell to make him believe he had encountered a wrinkle in space-time in the past, supposedly caused by Tony Stark, Hank Pym, and Reed Richards' construction of a prison within the Negative Zone, which Captain Marvel touched and was transported through time to the Negative Zone in the present day. Initially unsure of how to approach the situation, the Earth's heroes revealed Mar-Vell's history to him but also offered him a place in this new future as a warden for their prison, at least until, as the Sentry implicated, Mar-Vell would return to his past.

He is later called in to help the pro-registration heroes who revived him, at the end of the 2007 "Civil War" storyline; however upon seeing the chaos they are causing, he departs, to France, where he spends all of his time observing a painting of Alexander the Great in the Louvre and contemplates Alexander's similarities to himself. This painting is meant to be his psychological trigger, but due to an error in the methods of Skrull scientists, Mar-Vell retains his personality and memories prior to his Skrull captivity in their entirety. Most of Khn'nr's personality had accidentally been erased as a byproduct of the botched mental conditioning. Consequently, the Mar-Vell persona remains defiantly dominant.

When the Skrulls realize what happened, other Skrull agents posing as supervillains Cyclone, Cobalt Man, and a team of Kree soldiers unsuccessfully attempt to capture Captain Marvel.

When he learned the truth and became fully aware of his true identity he decides to embrace Mar-Vell's memories and rebel against the Skrulls and protect Earth from their invasion. However, at the same time that Skrull infiltrators strike S.H.I.E.L.D., S.W.O.R.D., the Baxter Building and a number of Stark Enterprises facilities, Captain Marvel launches an attack on Thunderbolt Mountain, deciding that he can destroy some of the things he sees as problems in the world, like the Government sanctioned supervillains Thunderbolts, during the initial strike of the Skrulls' invasion. He defeats the Thunderbolts, leaving Norman Osborn to convince Khn'nr that only he can decide who he really is, which leads Khn'nr to attack the Skrull armada. He destroys many of the fleet but is attacked by a Super-Skrull and it nearly kills him.

Barely alive after his effort, he manages to crash back on Earth, crossing Noh-Varr's path, who briefly mistakes him for the original Mar-Vell. Before dying from his wounds, Khn'nr spurs Noh-Varr into continuing Mar-Vell's legacy as the protector of Earth, branding with his dying words the Skrulls as liars and traitors and asking that Noh-Varr defeat the Skrulls and take on the mantle of Captain Marvel, which Noh-Varr does, joining the Dark Avengers under that name.

Powers and abilities
Though a Skrull, Khn'nr has the memories, knowledge, and skills of the Kree, Mar-Vell; presumably  including Mar-Vell's Kree military training giving him mastery of all forms of Kree unarmed combat, as well as extensive knowledge of the technologically advanced vehicles and devices of the Kree Empire. It is unknown if the botched mental conditioning has left Khn'nr any of his previous Skrull knowledge.

The Skrulls also developed technological replicas of the Kree Nega-Bands, though it is unknown if these work in the same fashion as the Kree version which converted Mar-Vell's psionic energy into strength, a high degree of imperviousness to harm, the ability to project force blasts, survive in space and the power to fly at faster-than-light speeds, the bands do give him exactly the same powers. They are also fully compatible with the originals, as seen when Ms. Marvel, armed with the original Nega-Bands is able to banish him in the Negative Zone by clicking her wrist on his.

Reception

Accolades 

 In 2017, Den of Geek ranked Khn'nr 3rd in their "Guardians of the Galaxy 3: 50 Marvel Characters We Want to See" list.
 In 2018, CBR.com ranked Khn'nr 12th in their "Every Captain Marvel Ever" list.
 In 2019, CBR.com ranked Khn'nr 9th in their "Every Version Of Captain Marvel" list and 8th in their "All The Captain Marvels, Ranked" list.

Literary reception

Volumes

Captain Marvel - 2007 
According to Diamond Comic Distributors, Captain Marvel #1 was the 49th best selling comic book in November 2007. Captain Marvel #2 was the 68th best selling comic book in December 2007.

Jesse Schedeen of IGN gave Captain Marvel #1 a grade of 8.6 out of 10, writing, "Brian Reed and Lee Weeks wouldn't have topped my list for a killer Captain Marvel team (no pun intended), but they certainly make a case for themselves. Reed is increasingly proving that he can easily survive without his frequent writing partner Brian Michael Bendis. Reed's own voice shines through in this issue, particularly with some well-written narration by Mar-Vell. Weeks, despite not qualifying as a very traditional superhero artist, is a near-perfect fit for this mini-series. In many ways Weeks evokes memories of Jim Starlin's work on The Death of Captain Marvel. If this series is eliciting favorable comparisons to that classic story already, I think we're in for a marvelously good time (har har)." Jesse Schedeen of IGN gave Captain Marvel #2 a grade of 8.7 out of 10, saying, "Lee Weeks is a name that hasn't graced many Marvel covers lately, but I hope that will change after this mini-series. Weeks is one of many similarly-accomplished noir artists at Marvel. His stark, realistic pencils aren't what I would have initially expected from this book, but his style wound up being a perfect fit. I highly recommend giving this series a look if you're still on the fence. I just don't think any supposed connection to Secret Invasion should be a motivating factor."

Collected editions

References

External links
 Khn'nr at the Marvel Database Project
 

Captain Marvel (Marvel Comics)
Characters created by Paul Jenkins (writer)
Comics characters introduced in 2007
Marvel Comics characters with superhuman strength
Marvel Comics extraterrestrial superheroes
Skrull
Marvel Comics male superheroes